Enpinghu is a metro station of Zhengzhou Metro Chengjiao line. The station is located beneath the crossing of Yongzhou Road and Poyanghu Road.

Station layout  
The 2-level underground station has a single island platform. The station concourse is on the B1 level and the B2 level is for the platforms.

Exits

References 

Stations of Zhengzhou Metro
Chengjiao line, Zhengzhou Metro
Railway stations in China opened in 2017